Evgeny Sergeyivich Alexandrov (born April 20, 1982) is a Russian former professional ice hockey player.

He played 13 games in the Kontinental Hockey League (KHL) with HC Vityaz during the 2008–09 KHL season.

References

External links

1982 births
Living people
HC Vityaz players
Russian ice hockey right wingers